Erin Matson (born March 17, 2000) is an American former field hockey player and the current head coach of the North Carolina Tar Heels field hockey team. A standout player on that team from 2018 to 2022, she led the Tar Heels to win four NCAA Championships.

Matson is one of only two players to be selected in the U.S. Women's National Team at age 16; the first was Katie Bam, selected in 2005.

Early life
Matson grew up in Chadds Ford, Pennsylvania, and started playing field hockey in 2006. Her mother, Jill, played field hockey and softball at Yale, and her father, Brian, played baseball at Delaware. Matson played as a midfielder and graduated from Unionville High School in 2018. In high school, she committed to play collegiate field hockey at the University of North Carolina at Chapel Hill, under legendary head coach Karen Shelton.

College career
In the fall of 2018, Matson made her debut in Chapel Hill, and over the course of her time there, became one of the most decorated athletes in North Carolina Tar Heels history, with career achievements rivaling those of Michael Jordan, Mia Hamm, and Tyler Hansbrough. While at North Carolina, she won the Honda Sports Award three times, being recognized as the nation's top collegiate field hockey player in 2019, 2020, and 2022. She won four NCAA Championships as a player (2018, 2019, 2020, and 2022), and five ACC titles in her five seasons in Chapel Hill. Due to the COVID-19 pandemic, the NCAA granted all student-athletes an extra year of eligibility, which Matson used to return to Carolina for a fifth playing season in 2022. Matson was recognized as the ACC Player of the Year and ACC Offensive Player of the Year every season she played at Carolina.

Coaching career
Following Karen Shelton's retirement in December 2022, and just a month after her own graduation from UNC, Matson was named the Tar Heels' head coach on January 31, 2023. In a move that paralleled Shelton's own hiring 42 years prior (Shelton was 23 when she became head coach) Matson became the Tar Heels' head coach at the age of 22. Matson inherits a defending national championship team made up of many of her former teammates.

Career highlights 
Matson was part of the United States team at the 2016–17 Hockey World League Semifinals in Johannesburg, South Africa. In the final, Matson scored the winning goal in a penalty shootout against Germany. Matson has represented the US in four other international competitions in her career, the first being the 2014 Youth Indoor Pan American Games.

 World Championship Experience
 2019 FIH Hockey Olympic Qualifier (Bhubaneswar, India)
 Gold - 2017 World League Semifinals (Johannesburg, South Africa)
 Silver - 2016 Junior Pan American Games (Trinidad & Tobago)
 Bronze - 2019 Pan American Games (Lima, Peru)
 Bronze - 2017 Pan American Cup (Lancaster, Pa.)
 Bronze - 2014 Indoor Pan American Games (Montevideo, Uruguay)
 7th - 2017 World League Final (Auckland, New Zealand)
 8th - 2016 Women's Hockey Junior World Cup (Santiago, Chile)
 9th - 2019 FIH Pro League (worldwide)
 14th - 2018 Vitality Hockey Women's World Cup (London, England)
 Other Career Highlights
 2021: At UNC, named All-ACC Preseason Team, ACC Offensive Player of the Week (Sept. 7), NFHCA Division I Offensive Player of the Week (Sept. 8)
 2021: Named to the U.S. Women's National Team (June)
 2021: Named to the U.S. U22 Junior Pan American Championship Training Squad
 2021 Spring: At UNC, ACC Co-Offensive Player of the Week (March 16), ACC Offensive Player of the Week (April 13, April 20), Ranked 10th in Female Athletes in ACC History, ACC Offensive Player of the Year, First-Team All-ACC, All-NCAA Tournament Team, All-NCC Tournament Most Valuable Player, NCAA Division I National Champion, Honda Sports Award Winner, All-South Region First Team, NFHCA South Regional Player of the Year, All-ACC Field Hockey Academic Team, NFHCA Division I First-Team All-American, NFHCA Division I National Player of the Year
 2020: At UNC, Preseason All-ACC Team, ACC Offensive Player of the Week (Oct. 20, Nov. 3), All-ACC Tournament Team, ACC Tournament MVP, NFHCA Division I Offensive Player of the Week (Nov. 4, Nov. 11)
 2019: Named to 2019 Pan American Elite Team
 2019: At UNC, Preseason All-ACC Team, First-Team All-ACC, ACC Offensive Player of the Year, ACC Offensive Player of the Week (Sept. 3, Sept. 10, Sept. 24, Oct. 1, Oct. 15), NFHCA Division I Offensive Player of the Week (Sept. 4, Sept. 11, Oct. 2), NCAA Division I National Champion, All-NCAA Tournament Team, All-NCAA Tournament Outstanding Player, All-South Region First Team, First Point USA/NFHCA South Region Player of the Year, Longstreth/NFHCA Division I First-Team All-American, First Point USA/NFHCA Division I National Player of the Year, Honda Sport Award Winner, All-ACC Field Hockey Academic Team, 2019-20 Mary Garber Award as the Atlantic Coast Conference Female Athlete of the Year
 2018: At UNC, Preseason All-ACC Team, First-Team All-ACC, ACC Rookie of the Year, ACC Offensive Player of the Year, ACC Champion, ACC All-Tournament Team, NCAA Division I National Champion, All-South Region First Team, First-Team All-America
 2018: Series against The Netherlands (Palo Alto, Calif.), Series against Canada (Chula Vista, Calif.), Series against Chile (Lancaster, Pa.), Series against Argentina (Tucuman, Argentina), Series against Belgium (Lancaster, Pa.)
 2017: Named to the U.S. Women's National, The Hawke's Bay Cup (4th, Hawke's Bay, New Zealand), Recorded first cap on March 31 against Australia, Series against Ireland (Lancaster, Pa.)
 2016: Named to the U.S. U-21 Women's National Team
 2015: Named to the U.S. U-19 Women's National Team, Belgium Tour
 2014: Indoor Series against Canada
 2013: Series against Canada
 2013-14: Member of the U.S. Women's National Indoor Team (Germany, Canada and Argentina Tours)

Head coaching record

References

American female field hockey players
Living people
People from Chadds Ford Township, Pennsylvania
2000 births
North Carolina Tar Heels field hockey players
Female field hockey midfielders
Pan American Games bronze medalists for the United States
Pan American Games medalists in field hockey
Field hockey players at the 2019 Pan American Games
Medalists at the 2019 Pan American Games